The Venus of Hohle Fels (also known as the Venus of Schelklingen; in German variously ) is an Upper Paleolithic Venus figurine made of mammoth ivory that was unearthed in 2008 in Hohle Fels, a cave near Schelklingen, Germany. It is dated to between 40,000 and 35,000 years ago, belonging to the early Aurignacian, at the very beginning of the Upper Paleolithic, which is associated with the earliest presence of Cro-Magnon in Europe.

The figure is the oldest undisputed example of a depiction of a human being. In terms of figurative art only the lion-headed, zoomorphic Löwenmensch figurine is older. The Venus figurine is housed at the Prehistoric Museum of Blaubeuren.

Context
The Swabian Alb region of Germany has a number of caves that have yielded many mammoth-ivory artifacts of the Upper Paleolithic period. Approximately 25 items have been discovered to date. These include the Löwenmensch figurine of Hohlenstein-Stadel dated to 40,000 years ago and an ivory flute found at Geißenklösterle, dated to 42,000 years ago. This mountainous region is located in Baden-Württemberg and is bounded by the Danube in the southeast, the upper Neckar in the northwest, and in the southwest it rises to the higher mountains of the Black Forest.

This concentration of evidence of full behavioral modernity, including figurative art and instrumental music among humans in the period of 40 to 30 thousand years ago, is unique worldwide and its discoverer, archaeologist Nicholas Conard, speculates that the bearers of the Aurignacian culture in the Swabian Alb may be credited with the invention, not just of figurative art and music, but possibly, the earliest religious practices as well. Within a distance of 70 cm to the Venus figurine, Conard's team also found a flute made from a vulture bone. Additional artifacts excavated from the same cave layer included flint-knapping debris, worked bone, and carved ivory as well as remains of tarpans, reindeer, cave bears, woolly mammoths, and Alpine Ibexes.

Discovery

The discovery of the Venus of Hohle Fels by the archaeological team led by Nicholas J. Conard of Universität Tübingen Abteilung Ältere Urgeschichte und Quartärökologie pushed back the date of the oldest known human figurative art, by several millennia, establishing that works of art were being produced throughout the Aurignacian Period.

Nearby a bone flute dating to approximately 42,000 years ago was found, the oldest known uncontested musical instrument.

In 2015 the team presented two further pieces of carved mammoth ivory discovered at the site that have been identified as parts of a second female figurine. The venus and the fragment are shown in comparison here.

Description
The figurine was sculpted from a woolly mammoth tusk and it has broken into fragments, of which six have been recovered, with the left arm and shoulder still missing. In place of the head, the figurine has a perforated protrusion, which may have allowed it to be worn as an amulet.

Interpretation
The discoverer, anthropologist Nicholas Conard, said: "This [figure] is about sex, reproduction... [it is] an extremely powerful depiction of the essence of being female". Anthropologist, Paul Mellars of Cambridge University has suggested that—by modern standards—the figurine "could be seen as bordering on the pornographic".

Anthropologists from Victoria University of Wellington have suggested that such figurines were not depictions of beauty, but represented "hope for survival and longevity, within well-nourished and reproductively successful communities", reflecting the conventional interpretation of these types of figurines as representing a fertility goddess.

See also
 List of Stone Age art
 Löwenmensch figurine
 Prehistoric art
 Venus of Berekhat Ram
 Venus of Tan-Tan
 Venus of Willendorf
 Venus of Dolní Věstonice

Notes

References

Further reading
 
 
 Cook, Jill (2013), Ice Age Art: the Arrival of the Modern Mind; [... to accompany the exhibition of the British Museum from 7 February to 26 May 2013]. London: British Museum Press.

External links

 Don Hitchcock (Don's Maps): "The Venus of Hohle Fels"
 The Earliest Pornography? at Science
 Obsession with Naked Women Dates Back 35,000 Years at LiveScience
 Nature Magazine

Aurignacian
Hohle Fels
Archaeological discoveries in Germany
Archaeology of Baden-Württemberg
Prehistoric art in Germany
Ivory works of art
Swabian Jura
European archaeology
2008 archaeological discoveries